Amerila crokeri, or Croker's frother, is a moth of the subfamily Arctiinae. The species was first described by William Sharp Macleay in 1826. It is found in the Australian states of New South Wales and Queensland and on New Guinea and New Britain.

The wingspan is about 50 mm.

References

Amerilini
Moths of Oceania
Moths described in 1826